Line Anna Ryborg Jørgensen Myers (born 31 December 1989) is a former Danish handball player, who last played for Team Esbjerg and formerly the Danish national team.

She was given the award of Cetățean de onoare ("Honorary Citizen") of the city of Bucharest in 2016.

Achievements

Club
Danish Championship:
Winner: 2011, 2013, 2015, 2019, 2020
Silver Medalist: 2014
Bronze Medalist: 2012
Danish Cup:
Winner: 2012, 2014
Finalist: 2013
Danish Supercup:
Winner: 2013, 2014, 2019
Romanian Championship:
Winner: 2016, 2017
EHF Champions League:
Winner: 2016
Bronze Medalist: 2017, 2018
EHF Cup:
Winner: 2011
Semifinalist: 2013
EHF Cup Winners' Cup:
Winner: 2015
Bucharest Trophy:
Winner: 2015

National team
European Championship:
Fourth place: 2010
World Championship:
Bronze Medalist: 2013
Fourth place: 2011

Individual awards
All-Star Right Back of the World Championship: 2011
MVP of the Bucharest Trophy: 2015
 Team of the Tournament Right Back of the Bucharest Trophy: 2015

References

External links

1989 births
Living people
People from Hvidovre Municipality
Danish female handball players
Handball players at the 2012 Summer Olympics
Olympic handball players of Denmark
Expatriate handball players
Danish expatriate sportspeople in Romania
Sportspeople from the Capital Region of Denmark